Richard Leo Tognetti AO (born 4 August 1965) is a leading Australian musician recognised internationally as a violin soloist, ensemble player, leader, composer and arranger, conductor and artistic director.  
 
He is currently artistic director and leader of the Australian Chamber Orchestra (ACO) and artistic director of the Festival Maribor in Maribor, Slovenia.

Training period
Born in Australia's capital city Canberra, Tognetti was already playing the violin at the age of four. He was raised in Wollongong where he began his violin studies with Harold Brissenden, the retired Scottish violist William Primrose and his wife Hiroko who was a Suzuki method specialist. At the age of 11 he was admitted to the Sydney Conservatorium High School and continued his tertiary studies at the Sydney Conservatorium of Music.  
 
His teacher was Alice Waten, herself a graduate of the Moscow Conservatoire and former student of Valery Klimov and David Oistrakh. While there Tognetti became leader and soloist of the chamber orchestra conducted by John Painter who was the Conservatorium's Director and later founder of ACO. In 1980 he won the National Youth Concerto Competition held in Brisbane by the Queensland Youth Symphony.

In 1987 Tognetti left Australia for post-graduate studies with Igor Ozim at the Bern Conservatory (now known as the University of the Arts Bern). During his time there he became a member of and soloist with the prestigious Camerata Bern, gave solo performances with the Bern Symphony Orchestra, and was guest concertmaster of the Basel Sinfonietta. Finally, at the end of his studies in 1989 he was awarded the Eduard Tschumi Musikpreis as the best graduate performer of that year.

Appointment to the Australian Chamber Orchestra
On return to Australia that same year Tognetti was appointed first as leader and then as artistic director of the Australian Chamber Orchestra, a remarkable development for a musician just 25 years old at the time. 2020 marked the 30th anniversary of his leadership of the orchestra.

During that time ACO has become regarded as one of the world's leading chamber orchestras. It tours several times a year around Australia presenting concerts in Adelaide, Brisbane, Canberra, Hobart, Melbourne, Newcastle, Perth, Sydney and Wollongong and participates regularly in various Australian arts festivals. Its annual overseas visits have taken it to the UK and Europe, North America and Asia where it has been heard in some of the greatest concert halls including Amsterdam’s Concertgebouw, London’s Barbican Centre and Royal Festival Hall, Vienna’s Musikverein, Los Angeles' Walt Disney Concert Hall, Washington, D.C.'s John F. Kennedy Center for the Performing Arts, New York City’s Carnegie Hall, Birmingham’s Symphony Hall and Frankfurt’s Alte Oper. It has held residencies in Hong Kong, a three-year post in London as International Associate Ensemble at the Barbican Centre's Milton Court, and through Tognetti's role as artistic director of Slovenia's Maribor Festival has had regular engagements there.

ACO's reputation has been affirmed in the Australian and international media. For example, Vincent Plush in The Weekend Australian said, "The Australian Chamber Orchestra is uniformly high-octane, arresting and never ordinary", The New York Times' Jeremy Eichler noted "virtuoso ensemble playing and an invigorating spontaneity that seemed to flow from Mr Tognetti's charismatic leadership", The Washington Post's Anne Midgette described the orchestra as having "the energy and vibe of a rock band with the ability of a crack classical chamber group", the Los Angeles Times's Mark Swed said, "this red hot band is long overdue for a major record contract and star treatment", Andrew Clements from the UK's The Guardian declared, "If there’s a better chamber orchestra in the world today, I haven’t heard it", and London's The Times hailed one of its appearances there by saying, "This must be the best chamber orchestra on earth."

Tognetti as performer, composer and arranger
Tognetti himself is an extremely versatile violinist with repertoire that covers all periods from the Baroque onwards. As his rapid professional progress suggests, Tognetti is highly regarded as a soloist with the opinions of many expressed in a review from the UK's The Telegraph: "He is one of the most characterful, incisive and impassioned violinists to be heard today."

Tognetti uses a number of violins according to need, most frequently the 1743 Guarneri del Gesù violin he has on extended loan from an anonymous owner. Others include period, modern and electric instruments. For example, in 1999 he and Australian rock musician Iva Davies co-wrote for an international millennium broadcast a work called The Ghost of Time for electric violin and orchestra and he performed it with the Sydney Symphony Orchestra on 31 December of that year.

Other works by Tognetti include The Red Tree for children's choir, chamber orchestra and projected images, co-written with Australian composer Michael Yezerski and inspired by Shaun Tan's illustrated book of the same name, music for Peter Weir's motion picture Master and Commander: The Far Side of the World co-written with Iva Davies and Christopher Gordon, and his music integrated with that of other composers in his documentaries such as Musica Surfica, The Reef, The Glide, The Crowd and Mountain. Musica Surfica, his film about music and his hobby surfing, won Best Feature at the 2008 New York Surf Film Festival.

As an arranger Tognetti has created repertoire for many different ensembles including ACO who have performed and recorded these works. Composers have included Janáček (String Quartet No 1 'Kreutzer Sonata'), Szymanowski (String Quartet No 2, Op 56), Haas (String Quartet No 2, Op. 7 'From the Monkey Mountains'), Paganini (Tognetti's own work Caprice on Caprices based on two of the original Caprices for solo violin), Schubert (String Quartet No 14 in D minor, D 810 'Death and the Maiden'), Beethoven (Violin Sonata No 9 in A major, Op 47 'Kreutzer'), Grieg (String Quartet No 1 in G minor, Op 27), Ravel (String Quartet in F major) and Satie (Choses vues à droite et à gauche (sans lunettes)).

Along with his busy schedule with ACO, Tognetti has appeared with other ensembles such as the Orchestra of the Age of Enlightenment, the Academy of Ancient Music, the Luxembourg Philharmonic Orchestra, the Slovenian Philharmonic Orchestra, the Handel and Haydn Society (Boston), the Hong Kong Philharmonic Orchestra, the Camerata Salzburg, the Tapiola Sinfonietta, the Irish Chamber Orchestra, the Nordic Chamber Orchestra and all the major Australian symphony orchestras, particularly the Melbourne Symphony Orchestra and Tasmanian Symphony Orchestra with whom he has appeared as soloist and director. He has also performed with various musicians from different genres including an appearance with Scottish classical accordionist James Crabb at the Opening Ceremony of the 2003 Rugby World Cup. At the 2001 Sydney Festival he made his debut as an opera conductor with Opera Australia's production of Mozart's Mitridate, re di Ponto, K 87.

Recordings
As a soloist Tognetti has made many recordings including the violin concertos of Bach (ABC Classics ABC4765691), Beethoven (ABC Classics ABC4654252), Mozart (BIS BISSACD1754 & BISSACD1755) Vivaldi (BIS BISCD2103) and Dvořák (BIS BISCD1708) as well as chamber works such as Bach's Sonatas and Partitas for Solo Violin, BWV 1001–1006 (ABC Classics ABC4768051) and the Sonatas for Violin and Harpsichord, BWV 1014–1019 (ABC Classics ABC4765942).

Either leading or conducting ACO in association with other international musicians he has also recorded many works including Beethoven's piano concertos with Stephen Kovacevich (EMI Eminence CD-EMX 2177 (nla), CD-EMX2190 (nla) & CD-EMX 2184 (nla), Bach's keyboard concertos with Angela Hewitt (Hyperion CDA 67307 & CDA 67308), Vivaldi's flute concertos with Emmanuel Pahud (EMI Classics 0946 3 47212 2 6), Shostakovich's Cello Concerto No 1 in E flat major, Op 107 with Pieter Wispelwey (Channel Classics CCS 15395), Baroque trombone repertoire with Christian Lindberg (BIS BISCD1688), Beethoven's Piano Concerto No 4 in G major, Op 58 with Dejan Lazić (Channel Classics CCS SA 30511), Haydn's cello concertos with Daniel Müller-Schott (Orfeo C080031A), and a ground-breaking 2000 collaboration with Australia's rock singer and former politician Peter Garrett and cartoonist, poet and cultural commentator Michael Leunig which resulted in the release of a recording of Saint-Saëns' The Carnival of the Animals accompanying a book of Leunig's text and illustrations (Sydney: Macmillan, 2000. .).

Personal life
Tognetti was first married to winemaker Susie Roberts. They had a son, Leonardo, in 2002, and were divorced in 2005.  He is now married to violinist Satu Vänskä, the assistant leader of the ACO. He has a brother, Simon Tognetti who is an Arts teacher in Wollongong, Australia.

Honours and awards
In 1997 Tognetti received an honorary Doctor of Creative Arts degree from the University of Wollongong, the youngest recipient ever to receive such an award from that university. This was followed in 2003 with an honorary Doctor of Music degree from the University of Western Australia and in 2005 with an honorary Doctor of Music degree from the University of Sydney.

In 1999 Tognetti was declared a National Living Treasure, an award administered by the National Trust of Australia and based on popular vote.

On Australia Day 2010 Tognetti was appointed an Officer of the Order of Australia for service to music through leadership of the Australian Chamber Orchestra, as an internationally acclaimed violinist, through the development and promotion of educational programs for children, support for emerging artists and contributions to charitable organisations.

AIR Awards
The Australian Independent Record Awards (known colloquially as the AIR Awards) is an annual awards night to recognise, promote and celebrate the success of Australia's Independent Music sector.

! 
|-
| 2021
| Brahms: Symphonies 3 & 4 Ensemble Offspring - Songbirds 
| Best Independent Classical Album or EP
| 
| 
|-
| 2022
| River 
| Best Independent Classical Album or EP 
| 
| 
|}

APRA Music Awards
The APRA Awards are held in Australia and New Zealand by the Australasian Performing Right Association to recognise songwriting skills, sales and airplay performance by its members annually.

! 
|-
| 2022
| "Spirit Voice of the Enchanted Waters" from River  (William Barton, Piers Burbrook de Vere & Richard Tognetti)
| Best Original Song Composed for the Screen
| 
| 
|-
|}

ARIA Music Awards
The ARIA Music Awards is an annual awards ceremony that recognises excellence, innovation, and achievement across all genres of Australian music.

|-
| 1993  
| Janáček: Kreutzer Sonata for Strings, Barber: Adagio for Strings, Walton: Sonata for Strings (with Australian Chamber Orchestra)
|rowspan="10"| Best Classical Album
| 
|-
|rowspan="2"| 1994  
| Mendelssohn: Octet in E Flat for Strings Op. 20 Sinfonia No. 9 in C. Swiss (with Australian Chamber Orchestra)
| 
|-
| Symphony Serenades and Suites (with Australian Chamber Orchestra)
| 
|-
| 2000  
| Beethoven Violin Concerto & Mozart Symphony No. 40 (with Australian Chamber Orchestra)
| 
|-
| 2006  
| Bach Sonatas and Partitas for Solo Violin 
| 
|-
| 2007  
| Bach Violin Concertos (with Australian Chamber Orchestra)
| 
|-
| 2008  
| Bach Sonatas for Violin & Keyboard (with Neal Peres Da Costa & Daniel Yeadon)
| 
|-
| 2010  
| Mozart Violin Concertos (with Christopher Moore & Australian Chamber Orchestra)
| 
|-
| 2011  
| Mozart Violin Concertos Vol 2 (with Australian Chamber Orchestra)
| 
|-
| 2016  
| Mozart's Last Symphonies (with Australian Chamber Orchestra)
| 
|-
| 2017  
| Mountain (with Australian Chamber Orchestra])
| Best Original Soundtrack, Cast or Show Album
| 
|-
| 2019  
| Heroines (with Australian Chamber Orchestra & Nicole Car)
|rowspan="2"| Best Classical Album
| 
|-
| 2020  
| Beethoven & Mozart Violin Sonatas (with Erin Helyard)
| 
|-
| 2022
| River (with Australian Chamber Orchestra)
| Best Original Soundtrack or Musical Theatre Cast Album
| 
|-

Bernard Heinze Memorial Award
The Sir Bernard Heinze Memorial Award is given to a person who has made an outstanding contribution to music in Australia.

! 
|-
| 2005 || Richard Tognetti || Sir Bernard Heinze Memorial Award ||  || 
|-

Helpmann Awards
The Helpmann Awards is an awards show, celebrating live entertainment and performing arts in Australia, presented by industry group Live Performance Australia since 2001. Note: 2020 and 2021 were cancelled due to the COVID-19 pandemic.

! 
|-
|rowspan="2" | 2017 || Himself || JC Williamson Award ||  ||rowspan="2" | 
|-
| Bach Violin Concertos - Richard Tognetti || Best Individual Classical Performance ||

Mo Awards
The Australian Entertainment Mo Awards (commonly known informally as the Mo Awards), were annual Australian entertainment industry awards. They recognise achievements in live entertainment in Australia from 1975 to 2016. Richard Tognetti won three awards in that time.
 (wins only)
|-
| 1992
| Richard Tognetti
| Classical Performance of the Year
| 
|-
| 1993
| Richard Tognetti
| Classical Performance of the Year
| 
|-
| 1994
| Richard Tognetti
| Classical Performance of the Year
| 
|-

References

External links
 Australian Chamber Orchestra website Home. Accessed 6 September 2019.
 Australian Chamber Orchestra on Spotify Australian Chamber Orchestra. Accessed 6 September 2019.
 Richard Tognetti on Spotify Richard Tognetti. Accessed 6 September.
 Australian Chamber Orchestra on Apple Australian Chamber Orchestra on Apple Music. Accessed 6 September 2019.
 Australian Chamber Orchestra on Soundcloud Australian Chamber Orchestra. Accessed 6 September 2019.
 Australian Chamber Orchestra on Instagram Login • Instagram. Accessed 6 September 2019.
 Australian Chamber Orchestra on YouTube Australian Chamber Orchestra - YouTube. Accessed 6 September 2019.
 Maribor Festival website Festival Maribor 2019: HOME. Accessed 6 September 2019.
 Richard Tognetti interviewed by Maureen Cavanaugh for the University of California Television (UCTV), August 2005 Richard Tognetti & the Australian Chamber Orchestra - La Jolla Music Society's SummerFest 2005. Accessed 6 September 2019.

ARIA Award winners
Australian male composers
Australian composers
Australian conductors (music)
Australian classical violinists
Male classical violinists
Sydney Conservatorium of Music alumni
1965 births
Living people
Australian people of Italian descent
Officers of the Order of Australia
21st-century conductors (music)
21st-century classical violinists
21st-century Australian male musicians
21st-century Australian musicians